Brook School was  a grammar school located in Hillburn, New York, in the Ramapo Central School District.  .  The school was an all-black school, which parents fought to desegregate in the early 1930s and again in 1943.,.  Thurgood Marshall was hired by the NAACP to desegregate the school.  Thurgood Marshall won a disparity case regarding integration of the schools of Hillburn, 11 years before his landmark case of Brown v. Board of Education, on behalf of the village's African-American parents.  Leonard M. Alexander and Peter C. Alexander, "It Takes a Village: The Integration of the Hillburn School System. Page Publishing, 2014.

Black children who lived in Ramapo attended the Brook School in Hillburn, a wood structure that didn't include a gymnasium, library or indoor bathrooms. Meanwhile, the Main School, attended by white children and now the headquarters of the Ramapo Central School District, included a gymnasium, a library and indoor plumbing.

References

Defunct schools in New York (state)
Historically segregated African-American schools in New York (state)